Oleksandr Marek is a retired Ukrainian footballer.

Career
Oleksandr Marek started his career in 1991 with CSKA Kyiv in Soviet Second League for two season where he played 65 matches and scored 1 goal. In 1993 he moved to Shakhtar Stakhanov for one season playing 12 matches and scored 1 goal. In 1994 he moved to Desna Chernihiv, the main club of Chernihiv, in Ukrainian Second League, where he played 34 matches and scored 2 goals. In the season 1994–95 he played 27 matches and scored 2 goals. In 1995 he moved to Systema-Boreks Borodianka where he played 5 matches.

References

External links 
 Oleksandr Marek footballfacts.ru

1972 births
Living people
Footballers from Chernihiv
FC CSKA Kyiv players
FC Shakhtar Stakhanov players
FC Desna Chernihiv players
FC Systema-Boreks Borodianka players
Ukrainian footballers
Ukrainian Premier League players
Ukrainian First League players
Ukrainian Second League players
Association football defenders